Lacazette is a surname. Notable people with the surname include:

 Alexandre Lacazette (born 1991), French footballer
 Romuald Lacazette (born 1994), French footballer